John Coleman Pickett (September 3, 1896 – September 1, 1983) was an American soldier, United States Attorney, and a United States circuit judge of the United States Court of Appeals for the Tenth Circuit.

Education and career

Born in Ravenna, Nebraska, Pickett was a Second Lieutenant in the United States Army during World War I, and received a Bachelor of Laws from the University of Nebraska College of Law in 1922. He entered private practice in Cheyenne, Wyoming from 1922 to 1949, and then served as an assistant state attorney general of Wyoming from 1923 to 1925, and as a county and prosecuting attorney of Laramie County, Wyoming from 1928 to 1934. He was an Assistant United States Attorney for the District of Wyoming from 1935 to 1949, becoming the United States Attorney for the District of Wyoming in 1949.

Federal judicial service

Pickett was nominated by President Harry S. Truman on September 23, 1949, to the United States Court of Appeals for the Tenth Circuit, to a new seat authorized by 63 Stat. 493. He was confirmed by the United States Senate on October 12, 1949, and received his commission on October 13, 1949. He assumed senior status on January 1, 1966. His service terminated on September 1, 1983, due to his death.

References

Sources
 

1896 births
1983 deaths
United States Attorneys for the District of Wyoming
Judges of the United States Court of Appeals for the Tenth Circuit
United States court of appeals judges appointed by Harry S. Truman
20th-century American judges
United States Army officers
People from Buffalo County, Nebraska
Assistant United States Attorneys
Wyoming lawyers
United States Army personnel of World War I